Tarik Brahmi (born May 19, 1968) is a Canadian engineer and politician. He was the Member of Parliament for the riding of Saint-Jean from 2011, when he defeated incumbent Claude Bachand of the Bloc Québécois, until 2015, and sat with New Democratic Party caucus.

Born in Lyon, France, with a father from Toudja, Algeria, he graduated from the Université de Montpellier in 1991 with a degree in Microelectronics and Control Engineering. He became interested in environmental causes in 1995, and worked in software development.  He immigrated to Canada in 2002 and became a Canadian citizen in 2006.  He was a candidate for the municipal council of Saint-Jean-sur-Richelieu in 2009.

Prior to being elected to parliament, he worked as a senior interviewer for Statistics Canada. Brahmi did not stand in the 2015 federal election.

Electoral record

Source: Elections Canada

References

External links
Official Website

1968 births
21st-century Canadian politicians
Canadian people of Kabyle descent
French emigrants to Quebec
Living people
Members of the House of Commons of Canada from Quebec
New Democratic Party MPs
Engineers from Lyon
People from Saint-Jean-sur-Richelieu
University of Montpellier alumni
Canadian people of Algerian descent